Walter George Whittlestone (1914–1985) was a notable New Zealand agricultural chemist, dairy researcher, community worker and peace activist. He was born in Abbotsford, Dunedin, New Zealand in 1914.

References

1914 births
1985 deaths
New Zealand chemists
New Zealand anti-war activists
Scientists from Dunedin
People educated at Gore High School